The What a Pleasure Stakes is an American flat Thoroughbred horse race for two-year-olds held annually at Calder Race Course in Miami Gardens, Florida. It is currently an ungraded stakes race run over a distance of 8.5 furlongs on dirt.

The race has traditionally been held during the Tropical at Calder meet, from late October through early January.  This meet normally has some of the strongest stakes programs of Calder's eight-month season.  Due to permit disputes with Hialeah Park Race Track, the race was pushed back in 1987 and 1991 into the following year.  Both of those races were subsequently run for three-year-olds and were won by Zie World (1988) and Sir Pinder (1992).

The race has served as a springboard for Kentucky Derby winner Unbridled as well as such graded-stakes winners as Suave Prospect, Alydeed, Primal, Creme Fraiche, Certain and Morning Bob.

Winners since 1991

Earlier winners 

1990 - Gizmo's Fortune
1989 - Unbridled
1988 - Reaffirming
1986 - Schism
1986 - Baldski's Star
1985 - Master Cho
1984 - Creme Fraiche
1983 - Morning Bob

The race was run in two divisions in 1986.

References

Horse races in Florida
Calder Race Course
Flat horse races for two-year-olds
Previously graded stakes races in the United States
Ungraded stakes races in the United States